Rolf Peterson (born 11 May 1944) is a retired Swedish sprint canoeist. He competed in the K-1 1000 m event at the 1964, 1968 and 1972 Olympics and won a gold medal in 1964 and a silver in 1972, finishing fifth in 1968. At the world championships Peterson won two gold and one silver medals in K-2 events in 1970–1971, all with Lars Andersson. He was awarded the Svenska Dagbladet Gold Medal in 1964 and served as the Swedish Olympic flag bearer in 1968.

References

External links

DatabaseOlympics.com profile

1944 births
Living people
Sportspeople from Halmstad
Swedish male canoeists
Canoeists at the 1964 Summer Olympics
Canoeists at the 1968 Summer Olympics
Canoeists at the 1972 Summer Olympics
Olympic canoeists of Sweden
Medalists at the 1964 Summer Olympics
Olympic silver medalists for Sweden
Olympic gold medalists for Sweden
Sportspeople from Halland County